The West Hills is a term generally used to collectively describe the western suburbs of Pittsburgh, Pennsylvania.  A smaller portion of the area is known as the Airport Area.

Though most communities are located southwest and west of the Ohio River, some of the West Hills area is located on the northern side of the river.
I-79 and state routes 60 and 65 serve the West Hills, with I-376 (known locally as the Parkway West), connecting the region to the Pittsburgh International Airport.

Communities
While there are no official boundaries of what communities are part of this Pittsburgh region, the following list of communities are considered to be part of the western hills area of Pittsburgh.

Carnegie
Coraopolis
Crafton
Crescent Township
Edgeworth
Findlay Township
Ingram
Kennedy Township
McKees Rocks
Moon Township
Neville Island
North Fayette Township
Oakdale Borough
Robinson Township
Rosslyn Farms
Sewickley
Stowe Township
Thornburg

History
Once largely rural, the West Hills area has grown considerably since the addition of the Pittsburgh airport in 1951.

The airport's main terminal moved to Findlay Township in 1991 on land that once was a farm.  With an empty terminal area in Moon, development on expanding the area's corporate business parks continued.

Major corporations
Dick's Sporting Goods corporate headquarters, Findlay Township
Nova Chemicals, Moon Township
FedEx Ground, Moon Township
GlaxoSmithKline consumer division, Moon Township

School districts
Carlynton School District
Cornell School District
Quaker Valley School District
Montour School District
Moon Area School District
Sto-Rox School District
West Allegheny School District

Geography of Allegheny County, Pennsylvania